Maximilian, Prince of Dietrichstein (27 June 1596 – 6 November 1655), was a German prince member of the House of Dietrichstein, Imperial Count (Reichsgraf) of Dietrichstein and owner of the Lordship of Nikolsburg in Moravia; since 1629 2nd Prince (Fürst) of Dietrichstein zu Nikolsburg, Baron (Freiherr) of Hollenburg, Finkenstein and Thalberg, was a diplomat and minister in the service of the House of Habsburg. He was a Kämmerer, Lord Chamberlain (Obersthofmeister), Conference Minister (Konferenzminister) and Privy Councillor of Emperors Ferdinand II and Ferdinand III, Knight of the Order of the Golden Fleece since and ruler over Nikolsburg (now Mikulov), Polná, Kanitz (now Dolní Kounice), Leipnik (now Lipník nad Bečvou), Weisskirch and Saar (now Žďár nad Sázavou).

Born in Vienna, he was the second but eldest surviving son of Sigismund II, Count of Dietrichstein and Baron of Hollenburg, Finkenstein and Thalberg, by his second wife Johanna von der Leiter (della Scala), Baroness (Freiin) von der Leytter zu Behrn und Vicenz, heiress of Amerang and member of the Scaliger family, former rulers of Verona.

Life

Like all his ancestors, Maximilian was in the service of the House of Habsburg, but instead of following a military career he pursued a civilian one. In his youth he was at the service of Archduke Matthias of Austria and closely watched the growing disputes between him and his unpopular older brother, Emperor Rudolph II. Firstly, he was involved in the intrigues that ended with the coronation of Matthias as King of Hungary and Croatia in 1608. After this -and thanks to the help of Matthias' chancellor, Melchior Klesl, Bishop of Vienna and Cardinal since 1615-, Maximilian was able to secure the coronation of Matthias as King of Bohemia. Finally, in 1612 Matthias became Holy Roman Emperor; shortly after, the new Emperor rewarded Maximilian with the title of Imperial Count (Reichsgraf), by diploma dated 18 September 1612.

Even before the death of Emperor Matthias in 1619, Maximilian was under the service of Archduke of Ferdinand II of Inner Austria; he supported Ferdinand II's senior adviser, Baron (and later Prince) Hans Ulrich von Eggenberg in his efforts to secure the election of Ferdinand II as Matthias' successor. Important steps were the cession of the Kingdom of Bohemia to Ferdinand II in 1617, and his election as King of Hungary and Croatia on 16 May 1618. A few days later (23 May) took place the Defenestration of Prague, where (primarily thanks to the intervention of his uncle, Cardinal Franz Seraph of Dietrichstein, Prince-Bishop and Duke of Olomouc), Maximilian managed to avoid the involvement of his Moravian estates in the following uprising. Finally, after further negotiations, Ferdinand II was unanimously elected as Holy Roman Emperor on 28 August 1619. Ten years later, on 7 August 1629, Maximilian received, according to the law of primogeniture, the title of Imperial Count Palatine (Kaiserliche Hofpfalzgraf) with unlimited territorial competence.

His uncle Franz Seraph of Dietrichstein, since 1599 Cardinal and since 1600 Prince-Bishop and Duke of Olomouc, received on 16 March 1624 the title of Imperial Prince (Reichfürst), being the first member of his family who received this hereditary title. Along with his investiture, Franz Seraph obtained the right to pass title to his bloodline, in particular Maximilian, his only surviving nephew. The Cardinal of Dietrichstein then instituted him as his sole heir and successor in the princely dignity. However, Maximilian didn't want to wait the death of his uncle, and received from Emperor Ferdinand II (as a special grace) on 8 November 1629 an extension of the previously awarded title, which enabled Maximilian to be raised himself as the second Prince of Dietrichstein. The confirmation of the princely title for him and his male descendants in strict primogeniture was confirmed on 24 March 1631. Thanks to the special intercession of Emperor Ferdinand III, Maximilian received a seat and vote in the Reichstag at Regensburg, with the condition of the acquisition of a direct imperial territory. Despite the resistance of the other German princes, on 28 February 1654, Maximilian received the seat and vote in the Imperial princely college, at the same time that the Princes of Salm, Auersperg and Piccolomini; however, due to the lack of compliance with the requirement previously solicited, the princes protested on the Imperial Diet, so Maximilian was virtually excluded from a direct participation.

Thanks to the Fideikommiss granted by his uncle Franz Seraph, Maximilian was able to purchase the Lordships of Kanitz, Wostitz (Vlasatice),  Saar (Žďár nad Sázavou) and Steinabrunn (in the district of Korneuburg in Lower Austria), where he instituted the primogeniture. This contributed significantly to the increase of the family fortune.

In 1634, Maximilian was made a Knight of the Order of the Golden Fleece, being the 388 Knight since his foundation.

After the death of Emperor Ferdinand II in 1637, Maximilian served his son and successor, Emperor Ferdinand III, and until his death in 1655 he held the offices of Kämmerer, Lord Chamberlain (Obersthofmeister), Conference Minister (Konferenzminister) and Privy Councillor.

In 1638 Maximilian left 146,000 florins extracted from his domain of Saar to the Cistercian Order. He also sold Steinabrunn in 1630 to the Bishopric of Slezské Rudoltice and Georg Maximilian of Hoditz by 15,000 thalers. In 1643 he placed at Nikolsburg Castle 2,000 barrels of sive wine.

Marriages and issue

In Lednice on 23 April 1618, Maximilian married firstly with Anna Maria of Liechtenstein (7 December 1597 – 26 April 1640), a daughter of Karl I, Prince of Liechtenstein and Duke of Troppau and Jägerndorf. They had thirteen children:

 Marianna Cäcilia (1619 – soon after).
 Anna Franziska (1621 – 16 September 1685), married on 23 April 1647 to Imperial Field Marshal and Count Walter Leslie.
 Franz Anton (1622 – soon after).
 Marie Eleonore (1 January 1623 – 20 March 1687), married firstly on 26 November 1646 to Count Lév Vilém Kaunitz and secondly on 15 April 1663 to Count Frederick  Leopold of Oppersdorf.
 Johanna Beatrix (1625 – 26 March 1676), married on 4 August 1644 to Karl Eusebius, Prince of Liechtenstein.
 Maria Klara (7 September 1626 – 28 January 1667), married on 16 January 1650 to Count Johann Frederick of Trauttmansdorff, Baron of Gleichenberg.
 A daughter (born and died 1630).
 A son (born and died 1634).
 Ferdinand Joseph (25 September 1636 – 1 December 1698), 3rd Prince of Dietrichstein.
 Maria Margareta Josefa (18 April 1637 – 15 December 1676), married on 21 May 1657 to Prince Raimondo Montecuccoli, Duke of Melfi.
 Maximilian Andreas (14 April 1638 – 4 December 1692), married on 18 January 1663 to Countess Maria Justina of Schwarzenberg. Had issue.
 Maria Theresia (1639 – 5 February 1658), married on 8 November 1654 to Karl Adam, Count of Mansfeld-Vorderort-Bornstädt (brother of her stepmother).
 Karl (born and died 1639).

On 4 December 1640, Maximilian married secondly with Sophie Agnes (4 November 1619 – 20 January 1677), a daughter of Wolfgang III, Count of Mansfeld-Vorderort-Bornstädt. They had six children:

 Maria Josepha (1641 – 15 December 1676).
 Franz Anton (1643 – 22 February 1721), a Jesuit.
 Joseph Ignaz (1644/50 – died soon after birth).
 Philipp Sigmund (9 March 1651 – 3 July 1716), married firstly in 1680 to Marie Elisabeth Hofmann, Baroness of Grünbühel-Strechau, and secondly aft. 1705 to Dorothea Josepha, Baroness Jankovský z Vlašimi. Had issue from first marriage.
 Maria Rosina Sophia (1652 – 4 November 1711), married firstly in 1662 to Count Franz Eusebius of Pötting, and secondly on 12 June 1681 to Count Václav Ferdinand of Lobkowicz.
 Maria Charlotte Anna Sophia Theresia Rosa Eustachia (20 September 1655 – 18 August 1682).

Ancestry

Notes

References

 J. S. Ersch, J. G. Gruber: Allgemeine Encyklopädie der Wissenschaften und Künste (reprint of the original edition of the 19th century) Akad Print & Publishing House, Graz, 1971.

1596 births
1655 deaths
Dietrichstein family
Knights of the Golden Fleece
Nobility from Vienna
Obersthofmeister